Amlingstadt is a small village located in Bavaria, Germany. It is in Upper Franconia, in the Bamberg district. Amlingstadt is a constituent community of Strullendorf.

In 2009, Amlingstadt had a total population of 687.

Geography
The village lies about 7 kilometers south-east from Bamberg, at the edge of the Hauptsmoorwald forest.

Amlingstadt is connected with its neighboring village, Wernsdorf.

Amlingstadt has an elevation of about 270 meters.

History
In the 1970s, the foundations of a small stone church were excavated in Amlingstadt. It was one of 14 mission churches of the Würzburg bishops, as part of missionary work starting in the 8th century amongst the Slavs in the Main and Regnitz region.

Culture
There are several community organizations in Amlingstadt:
 Organization for Seniors: "Seniorentanz"
 Veteran's Group: "Kameraden- & Soldatenverein Amlingstadt-Roßdorf"

Infrastructure
Amlingstadt lies on the Staatsstraße 2188.

References

External links
 
 St. Ägidius on Foracheim.de 

Villages in Bavaria
Bamberg (district)
Strullendorf